General elections were held in Dominica on 7 January 1966. The result was a victory for the Dominica Labour Party, which won 10 of the 11 seats. Voter turnout was 80.3%.

Results

References

Dominica
Elections in Dominica
1966 in Dominica
Dominica
January 1966 events in North America